James Godfrey MacManaway, MBE (22 April 1898 – 3 November 1951) was a British Unionist politician and Church of Ireland cleric, notable for being disqualified as a Member of Parliament, owing to his status as a priest.

Early life

James Godfrey MacManaway was born in County Tyrone in 1898, the youngest son of the Rt. Rev. James MacManaway, Church of Ireland Bishop of Clogher. He was educated at Campbell College, Belfast, and Trinity College, Dublin.

He served in the Royal Flying Corps during the First World War, having enlisted at the age of 17. In 1925 MacManaway was ordained as a priest of the Church of Ireland by the Bishop of Armagh. 

He married Catherine Anne Swetenham Trench (née Lecky), in 1926. He was Rector of Christ Church, Derry from  1930 to 1947. He served as Chaplain to Forces during the Second World War. In 1945, he was awarded an MBE.

Political career
In June 1947 MacManaway was elected to the Parliament of Northern Ireland, as Unionist member for the City of Londonderry. He then set his sights on Westminster, although, as a man of the cloth, there was some doubt as to his eligibility, owing to various historical statutes debarring clergymen of both the Established Church and the Roman Catholic Church from sitting as MPs in the British House of Commons.

MacManaway sought legal advice from the Attorney General for Northern Ireland, Edmund Warnock. Warnock advised him that since the Church of Ireland had been disestablished in 1869, the statutory bars would not apply to MacManaway.

MacManaway was selected by the Unionist party to contest Belfast West in the 1950 General Election. As a precaution, he resigned from his offices in the Church of Ireland. He won the election, defeating the sitting Irish Labour Party MP Jack Beattie by 3,378 votes.  Among the activists working on this campaign was a young Ian Paisley.

Political career terminated

As the first priest to take his seat in the House of Commons for 150 years, MacManaway was put under scrutiny by a Select committee of the House. They were unable to come to firm conclusions and, with some disquiet, recommended urgent legislation to clarify the law. The Home Secretary, James Chuter Ede, instead referred the matter to the Judicial Committee of the Privy Council.

Their judgement, in essence, identified a lacuna in the existing legislation, which would disqualify MacManaway. While the Irish Church Act 1869 did disestablish the Church of Ireland, since there was no express provision in that Act permitting its clergy to sit as MPs and MacManaway was still be subject to the strictures of the House of Commons (Clergy Disqualification) Act 1801, which debarred any person "ordained to the office of priest or deacon" from sitting or voting in the House of Commons.

Modern scholars have questioned the rationale of this decision but, nonetheless, the House of Commons resolved on 19 October 1950 that MacManaway was disqualified from sitting. The House did, however, indemnify him (by the Reverend J. G. MacManaway's Indemnity Act 1951) from the £500-a-time fines that he had incurred for voting in parliamentary divisions while ineligible. MacManaway had voted on five occasions.

MacManaway bitterly protested at what he perceived as an unjust anachronism bringing his career to an abrupt end, but did not contest the ensuing by-election, which was held for the Unionists by Thomas Teevan. His House of Commons career had lasted all of 238 days.

Death
Shortly after his leaving the Commons, MacManaway's wife died in January 1951. He resigned his seat at Stormont and died soon after, in November 1951, as the result of a fall. He was 53.

Subsequent change in the law

In the aftermath of the MacManaway case, in 1951 another Select committee examined the possibility of a change in the law. However, while acknowledging the anomalous and anachronistic nature of the ancient legislation, and taking soundings from various Christian denominations, the Committee recommended no specific change to the law. The law did not, however apply to churches such as the Presbyterian Church in Ireland and  ministers such as Martin Smyth successfully served as MPs.

There the matter lay for almost 50 years, until David Cairns was selected to fight the safe Labour seat of Greenock and Inverclyde. Cairns was a former Roman Catholic priest, and a re-run of the MacManaway imbroglio loomed. The Labour government introduced a bill removing almost all restrictions on clergy of whatever denomination from sitting in the House of Commons. The only exception would be Church of England bishops, because of their reserved status as members of the House of Lords. The bill came into law as the House of Commons (Removal of Clergy Disqualification) Act 2001 in time for David Cairns to take his seat in the Commons.

Arms

See also
List of United Kingdom MPs with the shortest service

References

Sources
 Who's Who of British MPs: Volume IV, 1945–1979 by Michael Stenton and Stephen Lees (Harvester, Brighton, 1979);

External links 

£500 a Day, contemporary article in Time magazine dated 30 October 1950, outlining the case.
House of Commons (Removal of Clergy Disqualification) Bill, UK Parliament research paper exploring the legal issues of the case.

1898 births
1951 deaths
Anglicans from Northern Ireland
Members of the Parliament of the United Kingdom for Belfast constituencies (since 1922)
People educated at Campbell College
Ulster Unionist Party members of the House of Commons of Northern Ireland
UK MPs 1950–1951
Members of the House of Commons of Northern Ireland 1945–1949
Members of the House of Commons of Northern Ireland 1949–1953
Royal Army Chaplains' Department officers
British Army personnel of World War I
British Army personnel of World War II
Church of Ireland priests
Alumni of Trinity College Dublin
Members of the Order of the British Empire
World War II chaplains
Members of the House of Commons of Northern Ireland for County Londonderry constituencies